Fairy Meadows, named by German climbers (German Märchenwiese, “fairy tale meadows”) and locally known as Joot, is a grassland near one of the base camp sites of the Nanga Parbat, located in Diamer District, Gilgit-Baltistan, Pakistan. In 1995, the Government of Pakistan declared Fairy Meadows a National Park.

Location 
Fairy Meadows is approachable by a fifteen kilometer-long jeepable trek starting from Raikot Bridge on Karakoram Highway to the village Tattu (Tato). The dangerous and narrow gravel mountain road from the bridge to the village is only open to locals, who provide transportation to visitors. In 2013, the World Health Organization declared it the second-deadliest road on the planet. From Tato onward, it takes about three to four hours hiking by a five kilometer trek to Fairy Meadows. The grassland is located in the Rakhiot valley, at one end of the Rakhiot glacier which originates from the Nanga Parbat and feeds a stream that finally falls in the River Indus. Since 1992, locals have operated camping sites in the area.

Tourism 

The six-month tourist season at Fairy Meadows starts in April and continues until the end of September. The site of Fairy Meadows, though partially developed, generates about PKR 17 million revenue from tourism, mainly by providing food, transportation and accommodation services. The road to Fairy Meadows was built by Brigadier M. Aslam Khan (M.C, H.J, F.K), First Commander Gilgit Scouts, which today employs the locals. The local community stopped the extraction of timber to conserve the forest and promote tourism in the area. The main attraction of this place other than the meadows itself is the view of Nanga Parbat Mountain. Tourists usually hike to the base camp of the mountain from Fairy Meadows.

Flora and fauna 
The grassland is surrounded by thick alpine forest. The high altitude area and north-facing slopes mostly consist of coniferous forest having Pinus wallichiana, Picea smithiana and Abies pindrow trees, while in the high altitude areas with little sunlight are birch and willow dwarf shrubs. The southern slopes are concentrated with juniper and scrubs, namely Juniperus excelsa and J. turkesticana. In the low altitudes, the major plant found is Artemisia, with yellow ash, stone oaks and Pinus gerardiana spread among it. Research has suggested similarities between Pinus wallichiana found in the meadows with a sister species, Pinus peuce, found in the Balkans, based on leaf size.

Among mammals, a few brown bears are found in the region, with their numbers declining. Some musk deer, regarded as an endangered species, are also present.

Gallery 
Hover the mouse click or tap on the following images to see their captions.

See also 
Tourism in Gilgit-Baltistan

References

Meadows in Pakistan
Camping in Pakistan
Protected areas of Gilgit-Baltistan
Nanga Parbat
National parks of Pakistan
Diamer District